Andrew Aversa (born June 23, 1987), known professionally as Zircon (stylized as zircon), is an American electronic musician, composer and audio technician primarily known for his work featured in video game soundtracks such as Super Street Fighter II Turbo HD Remix, Monkey Island 2: LeChuck's Revenge Special Edition, Soulcalibur V, Pump It Up, and Newgrounds.

Career
Aversa started arranging various video game music, which he uploaded to OverClocked ReMix. Aversa is also a developer and co-founder of Impact Soundworks, which makes sample libraries for music producers. He also joined Space Whale studios and developed Return all Robots which was released for PC and for Xbox 360.

Style
Aversa describes his sound as "electronica organica". He uses FL Studio for his compositions, and Image-Line has listed him as a power user on their website. He is a supporter of libraries and plugins for Kontakt (by Native Instruments) as well as all of the products made at Impact Soundworks.

Personal life
Aversa currently lives in Maryland with his wife Jillian Aversa, who is a singer, songwriter and performer on video game soundtracks. He is also an adjunct professor at Drexel University as well as a Drexel graduate. He has made multiple appearances at conventions and festivals such as MAGFest.

Releases

 Phasma Elementum (2004)
 Impulse Prime (2005)
 Antigravity (2007)
 The World Circuit (2007)
 Mass Media Constant (2009)
 Fittest – Original Soundtrack (2009)
 Vastlands (2009)
 Return All Robots! Original Soundtrack (2010)
 Unearthed (2012)
 Globulous Original Soundtrack (2012)
 Identity Sequence (2012)
 "Augment" (Single) (2013)
 "Across the Ocean" (Single) (2013)
 Getaway (EP) (2014)
 "Neptune" (Single) (2015)
 "Ice Lock" (Single) (2015)
 "Beyond Vision" (Single) (2016)
 Demon Truck Original Soundtrack (2016)
 "Just Hold On" (DJ Hlokzen Remix) (2017)
 "Take The Metro" (Single) (2018)
 Tangledeep (Original Soundtrack) (2018)
 "Spire" (Single) (2021)

References

External links
 zircon's official website

American electronic musicians
Living people
Drexel University alumni
Video game composers
1987 births
FL Studio users